Frohnleiten is a town in the district of Graz-Umgebung in the Austrian state of Styria.

Population

Transportation
Frohnleiten lies on the main  southern railway line connecting Vienna and Graz. The journey from Graz main station to Frohnleiten takes approximately 25 minutes. Starting from the railway station the old town center can be reached by walking over a bridge over the River Mur in about 10 minutes.

Main sights
In Frohnleiten and its surroundings are several castles and manor houses with historical importance.

 Burg Rabenstein
 Schloss Weyer
 Schloss Neu-Pfannberg

Many buildings that are close to the main square of Frohnleiten have been constructed during the 15-16th century and were part of a fortification.

References

Cities and towns in Graz-Umgebung District
Graz Highlands
Archaeological sites in Austria